Shaigiriis a mountain in Pakistan's western Himalayas. To its east stands Rupal Peak, to its west, the iceflows of Rupal Glacier. Despite its impressive height and unique pyramid shape, Shaigiri is greatly overshadowed by its giant neighbor to the north, 8,126-metre Nanga Parbat. Though the peak itself is seldom climbed, its northern base camp (11,989 ft/3,655 m) is a summer destination for travelers, mountaineers and local herdsmen. The peak is highly visible from most of the Rupal Valley. From Shaigiri's base one can see Nanga Parbat's Rupal Face and the eastern end of the Mazeno Wall.

Shaigiri is accessible via the Astore Valley, which opens to the great Indus River south of Gilgit. Most treks to Shaigiri, the Mazeno Pass and Nanga Parbat's Rupal Face are staged from the remote village of Tarashing, which is reached by jeep from Astore. Astore can be reached by bus or jeep from Gilgit, a major town on the Karakorum Highway.

Images

See also
 Highest mountains of the world

External links
 Nanga Parbat Trekking To Shaigiri With Concordia Expeditions

Mountains of Gilgit-Baltistan
Astore District
Himalayas
Six-thousanders of the Himalayas